Verkh-Kamyshenka is a rural locality (a selo) and the administrative center of Verkh-Kamyshensky Selsoviet, Zarinsky District, Altai Krai, Russia. The population was 705 as of 2013. There are 16 streets.

Geography 
Verkh-Kamyshenka is located 20 km southwest of Zarinsk (the district's administrative centre) by road. Grishino is the nearest rural locality.

References 

Rural localities in Zarinsky District